Juan Jesús Aquino Calvo (born 27 August 1975) is a Mexican politician affiliated with the PAN. As of 2013, he served as Deputy of the LXII Legislature of the Mexican Congress representing Chiapas.

References

1975 births
Living people
Politicians from Chiapas
National Action Party (Mexico) politicians
21st-century Mexican politicians
Panamerican University alumni
Members of the Congress of Chiapas
People from Ocosingo
Deputies of the LXII Legislature of Mexico
Members of the Chamber of Deputies (Mexico) for Chiapas